American Spirit Media, LLC is a broadcasting company based in Charlotte, North Carolina. Founded by Thomas B. Henson in 2003 as Ottumwa Media Holdings, it owns television stations in several cities in the Southeastern United States.

History
In 2003, Raycom Media acquired the Waitt Media stations (that included KYOU-TV in the Ottumwa, Iowa DMA). As Raycom already owned KTVO (licensed in Kirksville, Missouri, on the same DMA) and it could not legally keep both stations because the market has too few channels to legally permit a duopoly, KYOU was sold to then named Ottumwa Media Holdings (created on that year) for $4 million. The company entered into a shared services agreement and studio lease agreement with Raycom to operate KYOU and Raycom would have an option to purchase KYOU.

In August 2006, Ottumwa Media Holdings changed its name to American Spirit Media. On the same month, on August 11, KTVO was sold to Barrington Broadcasting as part of a $262 million deal for twelve stations, however Raycom retained its shared services agreement with KYOU.

In 2011, Community Newspaper Holdings sold Southeastern Media Holdings and its four stations to Thomas Henson (which later transferred in the same year its shares to American Spirit Media, which he owns) for $24 million and the assumption of $50 million in debt.

On January 11, 2012, it was reported that LIN Media would sell WUPW to American Spirit Media for $22 million. As part of the acquisition, WUPW entered into a shared services agreement with Raycom's WTOL. The acquisition was completed on April 20, 2012.

In July 2012, the company agreed to acquire WDBD and WXMS-LP from Roundtable Broadcasting. As part of the deal, the station's operations would be taken over by Raycom's WLBT. American Spirit also agreed to acquire WUFX and WBMS-CA from Vicksburg Broadcasting, but spin off the WUFX license to Tougaloo College for $1 (though it will operate that station under a joint sales agreement). Both transactions were consummated on November 13.

On November 27, 2013, American Spirit Media announced it would acquire KFVE and its satellites KGMV and KGMD-TV from MCG Capital Corporation. The stations are currently owned by MCG and operated by Raycom Media. A lawsuit was filed by Media Council Hawaii in 2014 to halt the transfer to American Spirit Media; consequently, as of January 31, 2016, the deal has yet to be consummated.

In August 2015, as a result of Raycom Media's purchase of Drewry Communications; Hoak Media sold Wichita Falls, Texas'-based KAUZ-TV to American Spirit Media. KSWO-TV (acquired by Raycom from Drewry) and KAUZ remained jointly operated, but the joint sales agreement between with KAUZ would be terminated upon the sale's closure due to FCC rules prohibiting such agreements by counting the sale of 15% or more of advertising time by one station to a competing junior partner station in the JSA as a duopoly in violation with the agency's ownership rules (the Wichita Falls-Lawton market has only four full-power television stations, four fewer than that allowed to legally form a duopoly); upon the JSA's termination, Raycom would enter into a shared services agreement with KAUZ, under which KSWO would handle news production, administrative and production operations, and equipment and building space for that station. The sale was completed on December 1.

On March 10, 2016, American Spirit's KVHP License Subsidiary, LLC acquired Lake Charles' KVHP for $2 million. After close its purchase on August 15, American Spirit entered into a shared services agreement and studio lease agreement with Raycom's KPLC to operate KVHP.

On June 25, 2018, Atlanta-based Gray Television announced it had reached an agreement with Raycom to merge their respective broadcasting assets (consisting of Raycom's 63 existing owned-and/or-operated television stations, and Gray's 93 television stations) under the former's corporate umbrella. As part of the cash-and-stock merger transaction valued at $3.6 billion – in which Gray shareholders would acquire preferred stock currently held by Raycom – Gray would acquire KYOU in  Ottumwa, Iowa and WUPV in Richmond, Virginia outright. In advance of the merger, Raycom exercised its options to purchase both stations outright from American Spirit Media.  The sale to Gray was approved on December 20 and completed on January 2, 2019.

Operations
The company owns or operates seven stations, which all but two are operated by Gray Television through shared services and/or joint sales agreements. Prior to 2019, Raycom Media provided services to these stations that are now operated by Gray, while WUPW is now operated by Tegna.

This list also contains stations that were owned by Southeastern Media Holdings, prior to its acquisition by American Spirit in 2011.

Current

1 Owned by Tougaloo College, American Spirit Media operates WLOO through a joint services agreement.

Former

Carriage disputes

2017–18 dispute with DirecTV and AT&T U-verse 
Under U.S. federal law, cable and satellite providers may not carry over-the-air stations on their systems without the consent of each stations' signal owners. American Spirit Media failed to renew its retransmission contract with DirecTV/AT&T U-verse upon its expiration on August 31, 2017. After a three-week extension period passed with both parties failing to agree on a new contract, American Spirit Media withdrew permission for DirecTV/AT&T U-verse to retransmit the signals of its stations as of 11:59 p.m. EDT on September 21. The dispute lasted for four months before a resolution was reached on January 30, 2018.

References

External links 
American Spirit Media website

Gray Television
Companies based in Charlotte, North Carolina
Television broadcasting companies of the United States
Mass media companies established in 2003